Balkan Gagauz Turkish, or Rumelian Turkish, is a Turkic language spoken in European Turkey, in Dulovo and the Deliorman area in Bulgaria, the Prizren area in Kosovo and the Kumanovo and Bitola areas of North Macedonia. Dialects include Gajal, Gerlovo Turk, Karamanli,  Kyzylbash, Surguch, Tozluk Turk, Yuruk (Konyar, Yoruk), Prizren Turk, and Macedonian Gagauz.

Although it is mutually intelligible with both Gagauz and Turkish to a considerable degree, it is usually classified as a separate language, due to foreign influences from neighboring languages spoken in the Balkans. The language is believed to have originated after the remaining Bulgar, Cuman, and Pecheneg tribes around the Balkans were influenced by Bulgarian, Byzantine and Ottoman rule.

Balkan Gagauz Turkish was recently given international prominence through the Oscar-nominated 2019 film Honeyland, in which the protagonist is an ethnic Macedonian Turk and mostly speaks in the local dialect throughout the film.

Population 

There were around 460,000 speakers of Balkan Gagauz Turkish in Turkey in 2019 and an estimated 4,000 in North Macedonia in 2018.

References

Agglutinative languages
Oghuz languages
Languages of Turkey
Languages of Greece
Languages of North Macedonia
Languages of Bulgaria
Languages of Kosovo